Kirani James  (born 1 September 1992) is a Grenadian professional sprinter who specializes in the 200 and 400 metres. He won the 400 m at the World Championships in 2011 and the 2012 London Olympics. In the 400 metres James also won the silver medal at the 2016 Rio Olympics and bronze medal at the 2020 Tokyo Olympics, thus becoming the first man to earn three medals in the centennial history of the event. He is Grenada's first and only Olympic medalist.

Prodigious from a young age, he ran the fastest 400 m times ever by a 14-year-old and a 15-year-old. He won a series of gold medals at the CARIFTA Games and the Commonwealth Youth Games and rose on the international stage with 400 m silver medals at the 2007 World Youth and 2008 World Junior Championships. James became the first athlete to run a 200/400 double at the 2009 World Youth Championships and was the 2010 World Junior Champion.

James received an athletic scholarship at the University of Alabama and won back-to-back NCAA Outdoor Championship titles in his first two years. He is the third fastest of all-time indoors (44.80 seconds) and ran a personal best of 43.74 at a 2014 Diamond League event in Lausanne. James is one of only eleven athletes (along with Valerie Adams, Usain Bolt, Veronica Campbell-Brown, Jacques Freitag, Yelena Isinbayeva, Jana Pittman, Dani Samuels, David Storl, Armand Duplantis and Faith Kipyegon) to win world championships at the youth, junior, and senior level of an athletic event.

Career

Youth career.
Kirani James attended the Grenada Boys' Secondary School at age 12. He was always considered as a promising athlete from since he first arrived at the scenes in the 400 and 200m in the Intercol games. At the age of 14 James won the gold medal in the 400 m at the 2007 CARIFTA Games in the under 17 category with a time of 47.86 seconds. He went on to win silver medals at the 2007 World Youth Championships with a time of 46.96 s, a time which is the fastest run by a 14-year-old.

In April 2008 he defended his CARIFTA 400 m title, winning the 200 metres with a time of 21.38 s. In July of that year, he won a silver medal at the 2008 World Junior Championships with a time of 45.70 s, which was his personal best, and a national youth and junior record. In October, he won the gold medal at the 2008 Commonwealth Youth Games with a new games record of 46.66 s.

James made his third CARIFTA Games appearance in 2009 and, in his under-20 debut, he defeated the defending 400 m champion and fellow Grenadian Rondell Bartholomew to win in a personal best of 45.45 s. This easily set a new championship record, beating Usain Bolt's six-year-old mark of 46.35 s. In consequence, he was awarded the Austin Sealy Trophy for the most outstanding athlete of the games.

James became the first youth athlete to complete a 200/400 metres double gold at the 2009 World Youth Championships in Athletics. Noting that he would be a junior athlete for a further two years, he focused on upcoming events, pinpointing the 2010 World Junior Championships in Athletics and the 2012 Summer Olympics as future goals. Following this, he won the 400 m at the 2009 Pan American Junior Championships. He was declared the 2009 Grenada Sportsman of the Year.

College athletics
At least ten colleges in the United States had expressed strong interest in recruiting James for their track team, including Baylor, Alabama, South Carolina, Florida State, and Arizona State. He accepted a scholarship offer from Alabama and in his first-ever appearance on an indoor track he ran a 45.79 in the 400 meters, placing first and breaking the 10-year-old school record of 46.46 held by Cori Loving.

James ran a new indoor personal best of 20.94 in the 200 m dash at the Texas A&M Challenge at Gilliam Indoor Track Stadium in College Station, Texas on 13 February 2010. He was runner-up at the NCAA Indoor Championships, finishing behind Torrin Lawrence. James lowered his 400 m personal best to 45.02 s at the 2010 CARIFTA Games, where he took a 200/400 m double, and improved further to 45.01 in winning the SEC Championships 400 m title. He claimed the gold medal over 400 m at the 2010 World Junior Championships in Athletics, but stated he was only running for times and was not satisfied with his winning performance of 45.89 seconds. He won the NCAA Outdoor Championship title in his first year of collegiate competition.

James moved up to third on the all-time indoor lists in February 2011, recording 44.80 seconds to win at the SEC Indoor Championships. This left only Michael Johnson and Kerron Clement as the faster athletes indoors, and also bettered LaShawn Merritt's previous world best junior time of 44.93 seconds. He failed to reach the podium at the NCAA Indoor meet as he clashed with another athlete and fell mid-race. He managed to repeat as the collegiate champion outdoors, however, as he edged ahead of Gil Roberts by one hundredth of a second. After the end of the college season, he made his professional debut at the London Grand Prix Diamond League meeting and established himself among the world's best with a personal best run of 44.61 seconds – a time which made him the fastest man that year.

Professional career
At the 2011 World Championships in Daegu, South Korea, both James and fellow Grenadian runner Rondell Bartholomew made the finals of the 400 metres event. James won the event in a personal best of 44.60 seconds, becoming the youngest 400 metres world champion at the age of 18. The medal was the first for Grenada in any event at the World Championships in Athletics. Nine days later, James won the 400 metres at the 2011 IAAF Diamond League meet in Zürich with a new personal best of 44.36 seconds.

At the London 2012 Olympics, James won the second 400 metres semi-final, achieving a season best of 44.59 seconds. At the end of the race, James exchanged name tags with double-amputee runner Oscar Pistorius as a sign of respect for him.

On 6 August 2012, James won the 400 metres Olympic gold in a time of 43.94, a national record, earning Grenada its first-ever Olympic medal and becoming the first non-US runner to break the 44-second mark. World record holder Michael Johnson said, following the race, that James stood a chance of beating his record if he was able to deal with the remaining flaws in his technique. James described his win as "a huge step for our country in terms of stepping up to the plate in track and field, just going out there and putting us on the map".

His domestic reception proved to be a euphoric one. Thousands lined the streets in preparation of his return, and he was greeted with an emphatic and vociferous national pride. Also upon his arrival the Prime Minister, Dr.Keith Mitchell announced Mr. James would be bequeathed government bonds totaling up to EC500,000, a commemorative stamp be crafted in his honor, a new stadium be named for him, and that he would be appointed a tourism ambassador.

In December 2012, James and Jamaica's Usain Bolt were named co-sportsmen of the year by Caribbean Journal.

On 3 July 2014, at the Athletissima meet in Lausanne, Switzerland, he improved his personal best to 43.74, equaling the fifth fastest time in history, and the fastest by a non-U.S.A. athlete.

On 17 November 2014, James and Jamaica's Kaliese Spencer were named the sportsman and sportswoman of the year respectively by the Caribbean Sports Journalists' Association.

At the 2015 World Championships, James won a bronze medal in the first World Championship 400 metres race where three men broke 44 seconds.

At the Rio 2016 Olympics, he won the silver medal in the 400 metres in a time of 43.76, behind Wayde van Niekerk's world record 43.03. The following year, James raced sparingly and was diagnosed with Graves' disease.

At the 2020 Tokyo Olympics, Kirani James earned a bronze medal in the Men's 400m finals, finishing 3rd behind Colombia's Anthony Zambrano (Silver) and Steven Gardiner of The Bahamas (Gold). In doing so, he denied U.S.A favorite Michael Norman a place on the podium.

He was appointed Commander of the Order of the British Empire (CBE) in the 2022 New Year Honours for services to Sport.

Statistics

Personal bests

International competitions

Circuit wins
400 metres
Diamond League: 2011, 2015, 2022
London Grand Prix: 2011, 2012, 2013
Weltklasse Zürich: 2011, 2022
Athletissima: 2012, 2014
Shanghai Golden Grand Prix: 2013, 2015
Meeting de Paris: 2013
Prefontaine Classic: 2014, 2015, 2016
Birmingham Grand Prix: 2014, 2016
BAUHAUS-galan: 2021

References

External links

Kirani James wins the 2012 Olympic Games men's 400 metres final in 43.94 seconds via the Olympic Channel on YouTube

1992 births
Living people
Grenadian male sprinters
Olympic athletes of Grenada
Olympic gold medalists for Grenada
Olympic silver medalists for Grenada
Olympic bronze medalists for Grenada
Athletes (track and field) at the 2012 Summer Olympics
Athletes (track and field) at the 2016 Summer Olympics
Medalists at the 2012 Summer Olympics
Medalists at the 2016 Summer Olympics
Medalists at the 2020 Summer Olympics
World Athletics Championships athletes for Grenada
World Athletics Championships medalists
Athletes (track and field) at the 2014 Commonwealth Games
Alabama Crimson Tide men's track and field athletes
People from Saint John Parish, Grenada
Commonwealth Games gold medallists for Grenada
Olympic gold medalists in athletics (track and field)
Olympic silver medalists in athletics (track and field)
Olympic bronze medalists in athletics (track and field)
Commonwealth Games medallists in athletics
Diamond League winners
World Athletics Championships winners
Athletes (track and field) at the 2020 Summer Olympics
Commanders of the Order of the British Empire
Medallists at the 2014 Commonwealth Games